Kurbinovo is a village in the Resen Municipality of North Macedonia, northeast of Lake Prespa. The village is best known for being home to the 12th century Monastery of St George.

Demographics
According to the statistics of Bulgarian ethnographer Vasil Kanchov from 1900, 200 inhabitants lived in Kurbinovo, all Bulgarian Exarchists. Kurbinovo has 137 inhabitants as of the most recent census of 2002, making it one of only four villages in the municipality that saw an increase in population from the previous census in 1994. The village population has been entirely ethnic Macedonian.

People from Kurbinovo 
Nestor Ivanov (1879 - ?), member of the Macedonian-Adrianopolitan Volunteer Corps

References

Villages in Resen Municipality